Graz is the capital city of the Austrian state of Styria and second-largest city in Austria after Vienna. As of 1 January 2021, it had a population of 331,562 (294,236 of whom had principal-residence status). In 2018, the population of the Graz larger urban zone (LUZ) stood at 652,654, based on principal-residence status. Graz is known as a college and university city, with four colleges and four universities. Combined, the city is home to more than 60,000 students. Its historic centre (Altstadt) is one of the best-preserved city centres in Central Europe.

In 1999, the city's historic centre was added to the UNESCO list of World Heritage Sites and in 2010 the designation was expanded to include Eggenberg Palace on the western edge of the city. Graz was designated the Cultural Capital of Europe in 2003 and became a City of Culinary Delights in 2008.

Etymology
The name of the city, Graz, formerly spelled Gratz, most likely stems from the Slavic gradec, which means "small castle". Some archaeological finds point to the erection of a small castle by Alpine Slavic people, which over time became a heavily defended fortification. In literary Slovene, gradec still means "small castle", forming a hypocoristic derivative of Proto-West-South Slavic *gradьcъ, which descends via liquid metathesis from Common Slavic *gardьcъ and via the Slavic third palatalisation from Proto-Slavic *gardiku, originally denoting "small town, settlement". The name thus follows the common South Slavic pattern for naming settlements as grad. The German name 'Graz' first appears in records in 1128. Related to the Czech Hradec (e.g. Hradec Králové) of the same meaning.

Geography 

Graz is situated on both sides of the Mur river in southeast Austria. Graz is the state capital and largest city in Styria, a green and heavily forested region on the eastern edge of the Alps. It is located in the Graz Basin and surrounded by mountains and hills to the north, east and west.

Neighbouring municipalities
These towns and villages border Graz:
 to the north: Gratkorn, Stattegg, Weinitzen
 to the east: Kainbach bei Graz, Hart bei Graz, Raaba
 to the south: Gössendorf, Feldkirchen bei Graz, Seiersberg
 to the west: Attendorf, Thal, Judendorf-Straßengel

Districts
Graz is divided into 17 municipal districts (Stadtbezirke):

History

The oldest settlement on the ground of the modern city of Graz dates back to the Copper Age. However, no historical continuity exists of a settlement before the Middle Ages.

During the 12th century, dukes under Babenberg rule made the town into an important commercial center. Later, Graz came under the rule of the Habsburgs and, in 1281, gained special privileges from King Rudolph I.

In the 14th century, Graz became the city of residence of the Inner Austrian line of the Habsburgs. The royalty lived in the Schlossberg castle and from there ruled Styria, Carinthia, most of today's Slovenia, and parts of Italy (Carniola, Gorizia and Gradisca, Trieste).

In the 16th century, the city's design and planning were primarily controlled by Italian Renaissance architects and artists. One of the most famous buildings representative of this style is the Landhaus, designed by Domenico dell'Allio, and used by the local rulers as a governmental headquarters.

The University of Graz was founded by Archduke Karl II in 1585, it's the city's oldest university. For most of its existence, it was controlled by the Catholic church, and was closed in 1782 by Joseph II in an attempt to gain state control over educational institutions. Joseph II transformed it into a lyceum where civil servants and medical personnel were trained. In 1827 it was re-established as a university by Emperor Franz I, and was named 'Karl-Franzens Universität' or 'Charles-Francis University' in English. More than 30,000 students are currently enrolled at this university.

Astronomer Johannes Kepler lived in Graz for a short period beginning in 1594. He worked as district mathematician and taught at the Lutheran school, but still found time to study astronomy. He left Graz for Prague in 1600 when Protestants were banned from the city.

Ludwig Boltzmann was Professor for Mathematical Physics from 1869 to 1890. During that time, Nikola Tesla studied electrical engineering at the Polytechnic in 1875.

Nobel laureate Otto Loewi taught at the University of Graz from 1909 until 1938. Ivo Andrić, the 1961 Nobel Prize for Literature laureate obtained his doctorate at the University of Graz. Erwin Schrödinger was briefly chancellor of the University of Graz in 1936.

Graz is centrally located within today's Bundesland (state) of Styria, or Steiermark in German. Mark is an old German word indicating a large area of land used as a defensive border, in which the peasantry is taught how to organize and fight in the case of an invasion. With a strategic location at the head of the open and fertile Mur valley, Graz was historically a target of invaders, such as the Hungarians under Matthias Corvinus in 1481, and the Ottoman Turks in 1529 and 1532. Apart from the Riegersburg Castle, the Schlossberg was the only fortification in the region that never fell to the Ottoman Turks. Graz is home to the region's provincial armory, which is the world's largest historical collection of late medieval and Renaissance weaponry. It has been preserved since 1551, and displays over 30,000 items.

From the earlier part of the 15th century, Graz was the residence of the younger branch of the Habsburgs, which succeeded to the imperial throne in 1619 in the person of Emperor Ferdinand II, who moved the capital to Vienna. New fortifications were built on the Schlossberg at the end of the 16th century. Napoleon's army occupied Graz in 1797. In 1809, the city withstood another assault by the French army. During this attack, the commanding officer in the fortress was ordered to defend it with about 900 men against Napoleon's army of about 3,000. He successfully defended the Schlossberg against eight attacks, but they were forced to give up after the Grande Armée occupied Vienna and the Emperor ordered to surrender. Following the defeat of Austria by Napoleonic forces at the Battle of Wagram in 1809, the fortifications were demolished using explosives, as stipulated in the Peace of Schönbrunn of the same year. The belltower (Glockenturm) and the civic clock tower (Uhrturm), which is a leading tourist attraction and serves as a symbol for Graz, were spared after the citizens of Graz paid a ransom for their preservation.

Archduke Karl II of Inner Austria had 20,000 Protestant books burned in the square of what is now a mental hospital, and succeeded in returning Styria to the authority of the Holy See. Archduke Franz Ferdinand was born in Graz in what is now the Stadtmuseum (city museum).

On April 2, 1945, while the heaviest Allied bomb raid of Graz occurred, the Gestapo and Waffen-SS committed a massacre against resistance fighters, Hungarian-Jewish forced laborers, and POWs at the SS barracks at Graz-Wetzelsdorf.

Population development

The more recent population figures do not give the whole picture as only people with principal-residence status are counted and people with secondary residence status are not. Most of the people with secondary residence status in Graz are students. At the end of 2016 there were 33,473 people with secondary residence status in Graz.

Climate 
Oceanic climate is the type found in the city, but due to the 0 °C isotherm, the same occurs in a humid continental climate with based in Köppen system (Cfb/Dfb borderline). Wladimir Köppen himself was in town and conducted studies to see how the climate of the past influenced the Continental Drift theory. Due to its position southeast of the Alps, Graz is shielded from the prevailing westerly winds that bring weather fronts in from the North Atlantic to northwestern and central Europe. The weather in Graz is thus influenced by the Mediterranean, and it has more hours of sunshine per year than Vienna or Salzburg and also less wind or rain. Graz lies in a basin that is only open to the south, causing the climate to be warmer than would be expected at that latitude. Plants are found in Graz that normally grow much further south.

 average temperatures: Graz Airport  / Karl-Franzens University 
 average rainfall:  with on average 92 days of rain (Karl Franzens University)
 average hours of sunshine: 1,989 (Karl Franzens University)

Slovenes and Graz
Politically, culturally, scientifically and religiously, Graz was an important centre for all Slovenes, especially from the establishment of the University of Graz in 1586 until the establishment of University of Ljubljana in 1919.

The student associations in Graz were a crucible of the Slovene identity, and the Slovene students in Graz were more nationally aware than some others. This led to fierce anti-Slovene efforts of German-speaking nationalists in Graz before and during World War II.

Many Slovenian Styrians study there. Slovenes are among the professors at the Institute for Jazz in Graz. Numerous Slovenes have found employment there, while being formerly unemployed in Slovenia. For the Slovene culture, Graz remains permanently important due to its university and the Universalmuseum Joanneum archives containing numerous documents from the Slovenian Styria.

A symposium on the relation of Graz and the Slovenes was held in Graz in 2010, at the occasion of the 200th anniversary of the establishment of the first and oldest chair of Slovene. A collection of lectures on the topic was published. The Slovenian Post commemorated the anniversary with a stamp.

Main sights

For the year that Graz was Cultural Capital of Europe, new structures were erected. The Graz Museum of Contemporary Art (German: Kunsthaus) was designed by Peter Cook and Colin Fournier and is situated next to the Mur river. The Island in the Mur is a floating platform made of steel. It was designed by American architect Vito Acconci and contains a café, an open-air theatre and a playground.

Historic city centre 

The historic centre was added to the UNESCO World Heritage List in 1999 due to the harmonious co-existence of typical buildings from different epochs and in different architectural styles. Situated in a cultural borderland between Central Europe, Italy and the Balkan States, Graz absorbed various influences from the neighbouring regions and thus received its exceptional townscape. Today the historic centre consists of over 1,000 buildings, their age ranging from Gothic to contemporary.

The most important sights in the historic centre are:
 Town Hall (Rathaus).
 The Castle hill (German: Schlossberg), a hill dominating the historic centre ( high), site of a demolished fortress, with views over Graz.
 The Clock Tower (Uhrturm) is a symbol of Graz, at the top of the Castle hill.
 The New Gallery (Neue Galerie), a museum of art.
 The Castle hill funicular (Schlossbergbahn), a funicular railway on the Castle hill's slope.
 The seat of Styria's provincial parliament (Landhaus), a palace in Lombardic style. It is one of the most important examples of Renaissance architecture in Austria and was built by Italian architect Domenico dell'Allio between 1557 and 1565.
 The Armoury (Landeszeughaus) is the largest of its kind in the world.
 The Graz Opera House (Opernhaus), the principal venue for opera, ballet, and operetta performances. It is the 2nd largest opera house in Austria.
 The Graz Theatre (Schauspielhaus), Graz's principal theatre for productions of plays.
 The Cathedral (Dom), a rare monument of Gothic architecture. Once, there were many frescos on the outer walls; today, only a few remain, like the Landplagenbild ("picture of plagues") painted in 1485, presumably by Thomas von Villach. The three plagues it depicts are locusts, pestilence and the invasion of the Turks, all of them striking the town in 1480. It features the oldest painted view of Graz.
 The mausoleum of Emperor Ferdinand II next to the cathedral, the most important building of Mannerism in Graz. It includes both the grave where Ferdinand II and his wife are buried, and a church dedicated to St Catherine of Alexandria.
 The Graz city park, located in the middle of the city centre during the Habsburg monarchy. It was designed by the German architect Johannes Schirgie von Premstätten-Tobelbad. During the Covid-19 pandemic eccentric parties were celebrated which were later dissolved by the police. The responsible, Jonas Fabio Cristo Pinter, an Italian club owner, was arrested and the partying stopped.
 The Castle (Burg), with Gothic double staircase, built between 1438 and 1453 by Emperor Frederick III, because the old castle on the Schlossberg hill was too small and uncomfortable. The castle remained the residence of the Inner Austrian Court until 1619. Today, it serves as residence for the Styrian government.
 The Painted House (Gemaltes Haus) in Herrengasse 3. It is completely covered with frescos (painted in 1742 by Johann Mayer).
 The Museum of Contemporary Art Graz (Kunsthaus)
 The Island in the Mur (Murinsel), an artificial island in the Mur river.
 Buildings, inner courtyards (e. g. Early Renaissance courtyard of the Former House of Teutonic Knights in Sporgasse 22) and roofscape of the old town.

Outside the historic city centre 

 Eggenberg Palace (Schloss Eggenberg) a baroque palace on the western edge of Graz with State rooms and museum. In 2010 it was added to the existing World Heritage site of the historic centre of Graz.
 The Mariatrost Basilica (Basilika Mariatrost) a late Baroque church, on the eastern edge of Graz.
 The Jesus's Heart Church (Herz-Jesu-Kirche) is the largest church in Graz with the third highest spire in Austria, built in Gothic Revival style by Daniel Schmidbauer (Austrian politician and doctor).
 The Calvary Hill (Kalvarienberg) in the Gösting area of Graz with a 17th-century calvary and church.
 The Graz University Hospital is the largest hospital in Graz and one of the largest hospitals in Austria. It's the largest Jugendstil building complex in Austria and was built between 1904 and 1912. It's run by the province Styria and is one of the most renowned hospitals in Austria and Central Europe.
 The Gösting Ruin (Ruine Gösting), a ruin of a hilltop castle on the city's northwestern edge, and Plabutsch/Fürstenstand, behind Eggenberg Palace, with a hilltop restaurant and viewing tower, as well as Buchkogel/Kronprinz-Rudolf-Warte are viewpoints for vistas of the city.
 The Schwanzberghotel in Hart bei Graz, a gothic built hotel during the lead of Jonas Draxler his disabled wife.

Greater Graz area 
 Österreichisches Freilichtmuseum Stübing, an open-air museum containing old farmhouses/farm buildings from all over Austria reassembled in historic setting.
 Lurgrotte, the most extensive cave system in Austria.
 Lipizzanergestüt Piber, Lipizzaner stud at Piber where the famous horses are bred.
 The Steirische Weinstraße is a wine-growing region south of Graz, also known as the "Styrian Tuscany".
 Thermenregion, spa region east of Graz.
 Riegersburg Castle, a mighty fortress that was never taken. It was a bastion against Turkish invasions

Politics

For much of its post-war history Graz was a stronghold of the Social Democratic Party of Austria (SPÖ), but since the late 1990s the party has lost most of its support on a local level. It was overtaken by the Austrian People's Party (ÖVP) in 2003, which remained the largest party in the city council (Gemeinderat) until 2021. With the decline of the SPÖ, the Communist Party of Austria (KPÖ) has become highly popular in Graz, despite its negligible presence on a national level. The party placed third with 20.8% of votes in the 2003 local election, which has been attributed to the popularity of local leader Ernest Kaltenegger. It fell to 11.2% in 2008, but recovered under new leader Elke Kahr, becoming the second most popular party in Graz with 19.9% in 2012 and 20.3% in 2017. The KPÖ's popularity in Graz allowed them to enter to the Styrian state parliament in the 2005 election, marking their first appearance in a state parliament in 35 years; they have retained their seats in the subsequent 2010, 2015, and 2019 elections. The 2021 municipal election saw a collapse in the ÖVP's popularity, allowing the KPÖ, once again led by Elke Kahr, to become the largest party with 29% of votes. She was subsequently elected mayor in November, leading a coalition with the Greens and SPÖ.

The most recent city council election was held on 26 September 2021, and the results were as follows:

! colspan=2| Party
! Lead candidate
! Votes
! %
! +/-
! Seats
! +/-
! 
! +/-
|-
| bgcolor=| 
| align=left| Communist Party of Austria (KPÖ)
| align=left| Elke Kahr
| 34,283
| 28.84
|  8.50
| 15
|  5
| 3
|  1
|-
| bgcolor=| 
| align=left| Austrian People's Party (ÖVP)
| align=left| Siegfried Nagl
| 30,797
| 25.91
|  11.88
| 13
|  6
| 2
|  1
|-
| bgcolor=| 
| align=left| The Greens – The Green Alternative (GRÜNE)
| align=left| Judith Schwentner
| 20,593
| 17.32
|  6.81
| 9
|  4
| 1
| ±0
|-
| bgcolor=| 
| align=left| Freedom Party of Austria (FPÖ)
| align=left| Mario Eustacchio
| 12,612
| 10.61
|  5.25
| 5
|  3
| 1
| ±0
|-
| bgcolor=| 
| align=left| Social Democratic Party of Austria (SPÖ)
| align=left| Michael Ehmann
| 11,325
| 9.53
|  0.52
| 4
|  1
| 0
| ±0
|-
| bgcolor=| 
| align=left| NEOS – The New Austria and Liberal Forum (NEOS)
| align=left| Philipp Pointner
| 6,447
| 5.42
|  1.48
| 2
|  1
| 0
| ±0
|-
| 
| align=left| Others
| align=left| –
| 2,825
| 2.37
| –
| 0
| ±0
| 0
| ±0
|-
! colspan=3| Invalid votes
! 1,807
! 
! 
! 
! 
! 
! 
|-
! colspan=3| Total
! 120,689
! 100.00
! 
! 48
! ±0
! 7
! ±0
|-
! colspan=3| Electorate/voter turnout
! 223,512
! 54.00
!  3.39
! 
! 
! 
! 
|-
| colspan=10| Source:  Stadt Graz
|}

Culture
During 2003 Graz held the title of "European Capital of Culture" and was one of the UNESCO "Cities of Design" in 2011.

Museums

The most important museums in Graz are:
 Schloss Eggenberg with Alte Galerie (paintings and sculptures from the Romanesque to the end of the Baroque period), Coin Collection, Lapidarium (Roman stonework collection), Archeological Museum (featuring the Cult Wagon of Strettweg) a special exhibitions area and the 90,000 m2 romantic landscape gardens.
 Museum im Palais: museum of Styrian cultural history from the Middle Ages to the present.
 Neue Galerie: visual arts from the 19th and 20th centuries.
 Natural History Museum: exhibition of botany, mineralogy and zoology.
 Stadtmuseum Graz: city museum.
 Kunsthaus: exhibition hall of contemporary art.
 Forum Stadtpark: museum of contemporary art.
 Camera Austria: museum of contemporary photography.
 Landeszeughaus: medieval armory comprising 32,000 pieces of armour and weaponry, largest of its kind in the world.
 Volkskundemuseum: museum of folk culture and lore.
 Diözesanmuseum: museum of the Roman Catholic Church.
 Künstlerhaus: exhibition hall of contemporary visual arts.
 Literaturhaus: museum of contemporary German literature.
 Museum der Wahrnehmung: museum of the senses, samadhi bath.
 Kindermuseum Frida&Fred: museum for children.
 Tramway Museum: 40 historic trams, the oldest dating from 1873.
 Kriminalmuseum: museum of criminology.
 Luftfahrtmuseum: (Graz airport) aviation museum.
 Hanns Schell Collection: key and lock museum, largest of its kind in the world.
 Austrian Sculpture Park: seven hectares of contemporary sculpture.
 Botanical Garden of Graz: three architecturally interesting glass houses plus gardens.

Architecture
The Old Town and the adjacent districts are characterized by the historic residential buildings and churches found there. In the outer districts buildings are predominantly of the architectural styles from the second half of the 20th century.

In 1965 the Grazer Schule (School of Graz) was founded. Several buildings around the universities are of this style, for example the green houses by Volker Giencke and the RESOWI center by Günther Domenig.

Before Graz became the European Capital of Culture in 2003, several new projects were realized, such as the Stadthalle, the Kindermuseum (museum for children), the Helmut-List-Halle, the Kunsthaus and the Murinsel.

 Tallest buildings

Buildings in Graz which are at least 50m tall:

Sports
SK Sturm Graz is the main football club of the city, with three Austrian championships, 5 Austrian Cup wins and 3 participations in the Champions League (where they were 1st in the first group stage in 2000/01 and therefore got promoted to the round of 16 as the first Austrian club ever). Grazer AK also won an Austrian championship, but went into administration in 2007 and was excluded from the professional league system.

In ice hockey, ATSE Graz was the Austrian Hockey League champion in 1975 and 1978. EC Graz was runner-up in 1991–92, 1992–93 and 1993–94. Graz 99ers has played in the first division since 2000.

UBSC Raiffeisen Graz plays in the Austrian Basketball League.

Graz Giants play in the Austrian Football League (American Football).

The city bid for the 2002 Winter Olympics in 1995, but lost the election to Salt Lake City. Nowadays there is a plan to bid for the 2026 Winter Olympics with some venues in Bavaria, Germany to cut costs using existing venues around national borders. It's still facing a referendum, meaning usually the end for many former Olympic bids in Europe and North America since 1970.

Styriarte 
Graz hosts the annual festival of classical music Styriarte, founded in 1985 to tie conductor Nikolaus Harnoncourt closer to his hometown. Events have been held at different venues in Graz and in the surrounding region.

Dialect 
Referred to as Steirisch by locals, Graz belongs to the Austro-Bavarian region of dialects, more specifically a mix of Central Bavarian in the western part of Styria and Southern Bavarian in the eastern part. The Grazer ORF, the Graz subsidiary of Austrian Broadcasting Corporation, launched an initiative in 2008 called Scho wieda Steirisch g'redt in order to highlight the numerous dialects of Graz and Styria in general and to cultivate the pride many Styrians hold for their local culture. Two reasons for a melding of these dialects with Standard German: the influence of television and radio bringing Standard German into the home and the industrialization causing the disappearance of the single farmer since the farming communities are seen as the true keepers of dialect speaking.

Transport 

An extensive public transport network makes Graz an easy city to navigate without a car. The city has a comprehensive bus network, complementing the Graz tram network consisting of eight lines. Four lines pass through the underground tram stop at the central railway station (Hauptbahnhof) and on to the city centre before branching out. Furthermore, there are seven night-time bus routes, although these run only at weekends and on evenings preceding public holidays.

The Schlossbergbahn, a funicular railway, and the Schlossberg lift, a vertical lift, link the city centre to the Schlossberg.

From the central railway station (Hauptbahnhof), regional trains link to most of Styria. Direct trains run to most major cities nearby including Vienna, Salzburg, Innsbruck, Maribor and Ljubljana in Slovenia, Zagreb in Croatia, Budapest in Hungary, Prague and Brno in the Czech Republic, Zürich in Switzerland, as well as Munich, Stuttgart, Heidelberg, and Frankfurt in Germany. Trains for Vienna leave every hour. In recent years many railway stations within the city limits and in the suburbs have been rebuilt or modernised and are now part of the "S-Bahn Graz", a commuter train service connecting the city with its suburban area and towns nearby.

Direct destinations include Amsterdam, Berlin, Düsseldorf, Frankfurt, Munich, Stuttgart, Istanbul, Vienna and Zurich. In 2021 a two-line metro system was proposed for Graz, which would make Graz the second Austrian city with a rapid transit system after Vienna.

Health
In Graz there are seven hospitals, several private hospitals and sanatoriums, as well as 44 pharmacies.

The University Hospital Graz (LKH-Universitäts-Klinikum Graz) is located in eastern Graz and has 1,556 beds and 7,190 employees. The Regional Hospital Graz II (LKH Graz II) has two sites in Graz. The western site (LKH Graz II Standort West) is located in Eggenberg and has 280 beds and about 500 employees, the southern site (LKH Graz II Standort Süd) specializes in neurology and psychiatry and is located in Straßgang with 880 beds and 1,100 employees. The AUVA Accident Hospital (Unfallkrankenhaus der AUVA) is in Eggenberg and has 180 beds and a total of 444 employees.

The Albert Schweitzer Clinic in the western part of the city is a geriatric hospital with 304 beds, the Hospital of St. John of God (Krankenhaus der Barmherzigen Brüder) has two sites in Graz, one in Lend with 225 beds and one in Eggenberg with 260 beds. The Hospital of the Order of Saint Elizabeth (Krankenhaus der Elisabethinen) in Gries has 182 beds.

There are several private clinics as well: the Privatklinik Kastanienhof, the Privatklinik Leech, the Privatklinik der Kreuzschwestern, the Sanatorium St. Leonhard, the Sanatorium Hansa and the Privatklinik Graz-Ragnitz.

EMS in Graz is provided solely by the Austrian Red Cross. Perpetually two emergency doctor's cars (NEF – Notarzteinsatzfahrzeug), two NAWs (Notarztwagen – ambulances staffed with a physician in addition to regular personnel) and about 30 RTWs (Rettungswagen – regular ambulances) are on standby. Furthermore, several non-emergency ambulances (KTW – Krankentransportwagen) and a Mobile Intensive Care Unit (MICU) are operated by the Red Cross to transport non-emergency patients to and between hospitals. In addition to the Red Cross, the Labourers'-Samaritan-Alliance (Arbeiter-Samariter-Bund Österreichs), the Austrian organisation of the Order of Malta Ambulance Corps (Malteser Hospitaldienst Austria) and the Green Cross (Grünes Kreuz) operate ambulances (KTW) for non-emergency patient transport. In addition to the cars, there's also the C12 air ambulance helicopter stationed at Graz airport, staffed with an emergency physician in addition to regular personnel.

International relations

Twin towns and sister cities
Graz is twinned with:

  Montclair, New Jersey, United States, since 1950
  Coventry, England, United Kingdom, since 1957
  Groningen, Netherlands, since 1964
  Darmstadt, Germany, since 1968
  Trondheim, Norway, since 1968
  Pula, Croatia, since 1972
  Trieste, Italy, since 1973
  Timișoara, Romania, since 1982
  Maribor, Slovenia, since 1987
  Pécs, Hungary, since 1989
  Dubrovnik, Croatia, since 1994
  Ljubljana, Slovenia, since 2001
  Saint Petersburg, Russia, since 2001 (On-Hold, since March 2022)

Other forms of cooperation and city friendship similar to the twin city programmes
  Niš, Serbia
  Banja Luka, Bosnia and Herzegovina

Notable residents 
The following are past and present notable residents of Graz.

 Marie Pachler (1794 – 1855), Austrian pianist
 Anne of Austria, Queen of Poland and Sweden
 Carl Julius Haidvogel, writer
 Wolfgang Bauer, Austrian writer
 Karl Böhm, Austrian conductor
 Ludwig Boltzmann, Austrian physicist, Professor of Mathematical Physics at the University of Graz (1869), chair of Experimental Physics at the University of Graz (1876–1890)
 Bernd Brückler, professional ice hockey player
 Constance of Austria, Queen of Poland
 Hans Dobida
 Elisabeth Eberl, Olympic javelin thrower
 Archduke Franz Ferdinand of Austria, Archduke of Austria-Este and heir to the Austro-Hungarian throne
 Olaf Fjord, actor, film director and producer
 Michael Gspurning, current goalkeeper for FC Schalke 04 II
 Gregor Hammerl, President of the Federal Council of Austria
 Nicolaus Harnoncourt, born in Berlin and raised in Graz, conductor known for performances of classical works on period instruments
 Victor Franz Hess, Nobel prize-winning physicist
 Manfred Hoeberl, powerlifter and strongman
 Hans Hollmann, theatre director and actor
 Johannes Kepler, was a mathematics teacher at a seminary school in Graz
 Helmut Kollars, writer and illustrator
 Otto Loewi Nobel prize-winning physiologist
 Hans Michael Maitzen, astronomer
 Helmut Marko, former racing driver
 Marisa Mell (1939–1992), actress born and raised in Graz
 Franziska Meissner-Diemer, journalist and writer
 August Meyszner (1886–1947), Austrian SS officer executed for war crimes
 August Musger, inventor of slow motion technique in cinema
 Olga Neuwirth, contemporary Austrian composer
 Lili Novy, Slovenian poet
 Emanuel Pogatetz, defender at 1. FC Nürnberg
 Johann Puch, Slovenian inventor, mechanic and vehicle producer
 Adam Rainer, only documented person in history to have been both one of the shortest and one of tallest people.
 Jochen Rindt, first Austrian Formula One champion raised in Graz by his grandmother
 Anton Rintelen, cabinet minister and Nazi conspirator
 Eduard Roschmann (1908–1977), Austrian Nazi SS Riga ghetto commandant
 Josef Schleich (born 1949), Austrian farmer
 Hermann Schloffer, surgeon
 Andreas Schnider (born 1959), theologian, academic teacher, author, publisher, consultant and politician of the ÖVP
 Gert Schnider, Abalone-champion
 Markus Schopp, former football midfielder
 Erwin Schrödinger, briefly chancellor of the University of Graz in 1936
 Werner Schwab, playwright and visual artist
 Arnold Schwarzenegger, former bodybuilding champion, actor and former governor of California. Born and raised in farming village Thal,  from Graz. 
 Friedrich St. Florian, Austrian-American architect
 Robert Stolz, Austrian composer and conductor
 Thomas Tebbich, decathlete and pole vaulter
 Nikola Tesla, studied electrical engineering in Graz
 Hertha Töpper, contralto, born in Graz
 Thomas Vanek, professional hockey player, born in Baden bei Wien, raised in Graz
 Hans Ulrich von Eggenberg, Austrian statesman and early "prime minister" during the Thirty Years' War
 Johann Bernhard Fischer von Erlach, architect of the Baroque period
 Ernestine von Kirchsberg, painter
 Leopold von Sacher-Masoch, writer and journalist, studied in Graz; the term masochism is derived from his name
 Baron Roman Ungern von Sternberg, prominent figure in the Russian White movement and dictator of Mongolia in 1921
 Otto Wanz, former professional wrestler who held AWA World Heavyweight Championship
Walter Wolf, business person
Oktavia Aigner-Rollett, prominent physician

Franz Voves, famous Austrian politician, State governor of Styria for 10 years, Icehockey player

See also

List of World Heritage Sites in Austria
Kastner & Öhler

References

Further reading

External links 

Official websites

 City website 
 Graz Citizen's Service
 Graz Tourism Office
 KulturServerGraz Town's cultural portal
 Public transport in Graz
 Graz old town - Secret World

History
 Jews in Graz. Expelled 1439 – returned 1447 – expelled 1496 – returned 1783 – holocaust  (from Encyclopaedia Judaica 1971)

Further information
 Various Graz Information Sorted by Categories. Choose from 5 languages.

 
Austrian state capitals
Cities and towns in Styria
World Heritage Sites in Austria